Ahmed Ali (born 15 November 1993) is a Sudanese sprinter. He competed in the 200 metres at the 2015 World Championships in Beijing, but was disqualified in the first round.  He also competed in the 200 at the 2016 Olympics, finishing in a seventh place tie with Jaysuma Saidy Ndure in the opening round.

Ali attended and ran for Alief Hastings High School in Houston, Texas, South Plains College and the University of Alabama.

International competitions

References

External links

 

Living people
1993 births
Track and field athletes from Houston
Sudanese male sprinters
American male sprinters
African-American male track and field athletes
World Athletics Championships athletes for Sudan
Athletes (track and field) at the 2016 Summer Olympics
Olympic athletes of Sudan
21st-century African-American sportspeople